Crambeck near Crambe and Malton in Yorkshire is near the River Derwent.

History

Roman
Crambeck is famous in antiquity as having been the Roman ceramic kiln site that lends its name to the locally produced Crambeck Ware pottery. Excavations in Crambeck were undertaken by Philip Corder in 1926–1927 with boys from Bootham School.

Georgian
The nearby Crambeck Road Bridge on the A64 was built in 1785 by John Carr (architect).

Victorian
Crambeck was the home of the Castle Howard Reform School (1856-?1986).

The home, run by Humberside county council, consisted of 5 separate blocks of houses with dormitory rooms in each.

The houses were named,

1. House (Yellow)

2. House (Blue)

3. House (Green)

4. House (Brown)

And a 5th house that was a secure unit, attached to 4 house, with locked secured doors and 4 cells like they have in police stations.

Modern
A local history project recorded memories of life in the village in the 1930s and 1940s.

In June 2014 access to Crambeck was limited by a spillage of mashed potato on the nearby A64.

See also
History of Yorkshire
Crambeck Ware

References

External links

 Crambeck Village Community Website

Villages in North Yorkshire